Streptomyces violarus is a bacterium species from the genus of Streptomyces which has been isolated from soil in Egypt.

See also 
 List of Streptomyces species

References

Further reading

External links
Type strain of Streptomyces violarus at BacDive -  the Bacterial Diversity Metadatabase	

violarus
Bacteria described in 1970